Francis Alvin George Hamilton,  (March 30, 1912June 29, 2004) was a Canadian politician. Hamilton led the Progressive Conservative Party of Saskatchewan from 1949 until he was elected to the House of Commons of Canada in the 1957 general election. That election brought the federal Progressive Conservative Party of Canada to power under John Diefenbaker. He served as Minister of Northern Affairs and National Resources, 1957 to 1960. He promoted a new vision of northern development. He was Minister of Agriculture, 1960 to 1963, where he promoted wheat sales to China.

Life and career
Born in Kenora, Ontario, he received a Bachelor of Arts degree in 1938 from the University of Saskatchewan. During World War II, he served with the Royal Canadian Air Force as a navigator and flight lieutenant. He was awarded the Burma Star Decoration.

After the war, he ran three times unsuccessfully as the Progressive Conservative candidate for the Canadian House of Commons in the 1945, 1949, and 1953 elections. He was elected in 1957 in the riding of Qu'Appelle and re-elected 4 more times in 1958, 1962, 1963, and 1965. He ran in the riding of Regina East in the 1968 federal election, and lost by 192 votes to the New Democrat candidate. He was elected again in the 1972 federal election in the riding of Qu'Appelle—Moose Mountain and was re-elected 4 more times in 1974, 1979, 1980, and 1984. He retired in 1988.

Hamilton served as Minister of Northern Affairs and National Resources in the Diefenbaker cabinet from 1957 to 1960, supporting a new vision of northern development. From 1960 to the 1963 election, when the Diefenbaker government was defeated, Hamilton served as Minister of Agriculture, pioneering wheat sales to the People's Republic of China. He was a candidate at the 1967 PC leadership convention, making it to the fourth ballot before dropping out.

In 1992, Hamilton was granted the honorific style of "The Right Honourable" by Elizabeth II in honour of his service to Canada. This is a rare honour for someone who did not serve as Prime Minister of Canada, Chief Justice of Canada or Governor General of Canada.

After Hamilton retired from politics in 1988, he lived a relatively secluded life in the Ottawa-area town of Manotick, where he lived until his death in 2004. On June 28, 2007, the newly refurbished Government of Canada Building in downtown Regina, Saskatchewan, was officially named the Francis Alvin George Hamilton Building.  Also, one of the reception rooms at the Embassy of Canada to China in Beijing is called the Alvin Hamilton Room.

Further reading

Mitcham, Chad J., China's Economic Relations with the West and Japan: Grain, Trade and Diplomacy, 1949–79, Routledge, New York and London, 2005.
Alvin Hamilton fonds at Library and Archives Canada.

Electoral record

References

External links
 
Agriculture and Agri-Food Canada biography

1912 births
2004 deaths
Canadian Protestants
Members of the House of Commons of Canada from Saskatchewan
Members of the King's Privy Council for Canada
People from Kenora
Progressive Conservative Party of Canada MPs
University of Saskatchewan alumni
Saskatchewan political party leaders
Progressive Conservative Party of Canada leadership candidates